Agdistis bigoti is a moth in the family Pterophoridae. It is known from Crete.

The wingspan is 24–26 mm. The forewings are grey, as are the hindwings, although these are somewhat brighter.

References

Agdistinae
Moths of Europe
Moths described in 1976